Soboro-ppang, or Gombo-ppang (standard language), often translated as soboro bread, soboro pastry, or soboro bun, and also known as Korean streusel bread, is a sweet bun with a streusel-like upper crust popular in Korea. The bun is made of flour, sugar, eggs, and dough and baked with a crisp, bumpy surface on top. The word "soboro" is a Japanese word which refers to the streusel topping of the bun, which is often made with peanut butter as a key ingredient. Soboro refers to fried and minced meat or fish in Japanese, which resembles the streusel on top of the bread.

See also 
 Melonpan
 Pineapple bun
 List of sweet breads

References 

Korean breads
Sweet breads